Sterijino pozorje is an annual theater festival held since 1956 in the Serbian National Theater in Novi Sad, featuring the national theaters of Serbia and previously Yugoslavia. It is the most prestigious theater festival in the country. 

The festival was named after playwright Jovan Sterija Popović. It is typically held in late May, and lasts 3-5 days, featuring up to a dozen plays in the competitive program and several plays in auxiliary program Krugovi ('Circles'). Sterija's Awards are given out for the best play; original text; main and supporting roles in women's and men's category; directing; scenography; costume; music; as well as a special award.

References

External links
www.pozorje.org.rs (Official site)
Pictures & info on the Festival and Jovan Sterija Popović (in Serbian)

1956 establishments in Yugoslavia
Cultural festivals in Serbia
Culture in Novi Sad
Serbian culture
Theatre festivals in Serbia
Recurring events established in 1956
Spring (season) events in Serbia